Poi ( The Lie) is a 2006 Indian Tamil-language film, directed by K. Balachander in his 101st and final film as a director. Produced by Prakash Raj, the film starts Uday Kiran (in his Tamil debut) and Vimala Raman, while Geetu Mohandas, Prakash Raj, Adithya Menon, and Avinash play supporting roles along with the director in a guest appearance. The music was composed by Vidyasagar with cinematography by Biju Viswanath. The film released on 22 December 2006.

Plot
Valluvanar (Avinash) is an upright political leader in Tamil Nadu who is much respected for his honesty and uprightness, and he refuses to compromise on this trait, even when his only son Kamban (Uday Kiran) finds himself in jail for no fault of his. The opposition party takes advantage of the situation and bails out Kamban, who joins the party, much to his father's embarrassment. The media laps it up, sensationalizing it further. Kamban decides to leave the country until things cool down. Only his mother Vasuki (Anuradha Krishnamurthy), with whom he is close, is aware of this plan. Kamban arrives at Sri Lanka where he befriends Banerjee (Badava Gopi), a Bengali, and stays with him. One day, he finds a Tamil literary book on the beach, which he traces to Shilpa (Vimala Raman), the owner of the book. Shilpa is a college student preparing for civil services examination. The film juggles between reality and fiction, where Theepori, the fictitious father image of Kamban, advises him to fall in love. That sets in rolling the love story as Kamban persists in wooing Shilpa. She is staying with her brother's family. Shilpa is keen on realizing her ambitions and feels that love and marriage often comes in the way of women's career. The rest of the story is about the emotional conflict between her career and love. After Vasuki's death, Valluvanar reaches Sri Lanka. Kamban is unaware of his mother's death. Shilpa's family meets Valluvanar. Meanwhile, Kamban goes to meet Shilpa to hand over the passport, but due to his friend's lie, he ends up thinking that Shilpa committed suicide. How the lie told to reunite the lovers gives the tragic end is the end of the story.

Cast
Uday Kiran as Kamban a.k.a. Bharati
Vimala Raman as Shilpa
Geetu Mohandas as Ramya
Prakash Raj as Vidhi (Fate)
Adithya Menon as Vishnu
Avinash as Valluvanar
Sridhar as Roshan
Anuradha Krishnamurthy as Vasuki
Renuka as Menaka
Badava Gopi as Banerjee
Bombay Gnanam
K. Balachander (cameo appearance)
Samuthirakani (cameo appearance)

Soundtrack

Music was composed by Vidyasagar.

Production
The film was launched in 2005 at the eve of KB's 75th birthday. There were rumors that Rajini and Kamal would appear in cameo appearances but proved false. Telugu actor Udaykiran was selected to play the lead role making his debut in Tamil and Vimala Raman who was brought up in Australia was selected as heroine. Geethu Mohandas who earlier appeared in Nala Damayanthi was selected to appear in this film making "Poi" her second and last film in Tamil. K Balachander and Prakshraj themselves acted in this film. There were rumours that Jayashree of "Thendral Ennai thodu" fame would appear in this film which became false.

Release
The film was originally scheduled to release on 6 October 2006, distributors were initially reluctant to take the film as they felt that subject was outdated but Aascar films procured the rights. Release was postponed to Diwali but finally released in December. The film was dubbed in Telugu as Abaddam.

Critical reception
Rediff wrote:"Poi is a case in point – you expect so much from Balachander, a genuine icon of Tamil filmdom; if you leave adulation aside, though, you have to say that his latest film disappoints". Nowrunning wrote:"Poi lacks the marks of KB's earlier films".

References

External links
 Poi at Rotten Tomatoes

2006 films
Films directed by K. Balachander
2000s Tamil-language films
Films scored by Vidyasagar
Films with screenplays by K. Balachander
Indian romantic drama films
Films shot in Sri Lanka
2006 romantic drama films